The North Korea national badminton team represents North Korea in international badminton team competitions. The team has participated once in the Sudirman Cup, which was in 1991. The team was ranked 31st in the leaderboards. The North Korean team made a rare public appearance after a long hiatus in competing when they participated in the 2019 Military World Games badminton team event in Wuhan, China. They have never medaled in any badminton tournament.

History 

It is unknown when the national badminton team of North Korea was established. The national team soon became affiliated with the Olympic Committee of the Democratic People's Republic of Korea and was eligible to compete in international tournaments. North Korea has not competed in many team tournaments in the international stage. The national team made a few appearances in international team tournaments and have achieved decent results in the 1990s.

Men's team 
The North Korean men's team made their international debut when the team competed in the qualifiers for the 1990 Thomas Cup. The team finished on the bottom of their group, losing 0–5 to Iceland, 1–4 to Belgium. The team almost beat France but lost 2–3. The team later competed in the 1990 Asian Games in September 1990. The team had a bye in the first round and entered the quarter-finals. The team failed to advance further after losing to Malaysia 0–5 in quarter-finals. In 1993, the team competed in the 1993 East Asian Games men's team event and lost the quarter-finals to China. 

After 26 years, the men's team made another appearance in the 2019 Military World Games men's team event. The team lost 0–5 to China, South Korea and Thailand in the group but won 3–2 against France to achieve fourth place in the event.

Women's team 
The women's team took part in qualifying for the 1990 Uber Cup. The team failed to qualify after finishing 2nd in their group. The team won 3–2 against Austria, 5–0 against Spain but lost 0–5 to the United States.

Mixed team 
The North Korean mixed team first competed in the 1991 Sudirman Cup. The team were placed in Group 8 with teams Spain, Mauritius, Italy and Malta. The team performed well and topped the group, winning 4–1 against Spain and Mauritius, then 5–0 against Italy and Malta. The team finished in 31st place on the overall ranking.

Competitive record

Sudirman Cup

Asian Games

Men's team

East Asian Games

Men's team

Military World Games

Men's team

Junior competitive record

Asian Junior Team Championships

Mixed team

Staff 
The following list shows the coaching staff of the North Korean national badminton team.

Players

Current squad

Men's team

Women's team

References

Badminton
National badminton teams
Badminton in North Korea